Benjamin Hübner (born 4 July 1989) is a German former professional footballer who played as a defender.

Career

Early career
Born in Wiesbaden, Hübner made his professional debut in the 2. Bundesliga for Wehen Wiesbaden on 18 May 2008 when he came on as a substitute for Benjamin Siegert in the 90th minute in a game against Freiburg.

Ingolstadt
On 6 May 2014, he signed a three-year contract with Ingolstadt.

Hoffenheim
On 18 May 2016, he signed a contract with Hoffenheim.

Retirement
On 6 December 2022, Hübner announced his retirement from football after persistent injuries had resulted in him playing just 478 minutes in two-and-a-half years.

Personal life
His brothers Christopher and Florian are professional footballers and his father Bruno is director of sports at Eintracht Frankfurt.

Career statistics

Honours

Club
Ingolstadt
 2. Bundesliga:  2014–15

References

External links
 
 
 

1989 births
Living people
German footballers
SV Wehen Wiesbaden players
VfR Aalen players
FC Ingolstadt 04 players
TSG 1899 Hoffenheim players
Association football defenders
Bundesliga players
2. Bundesliga players
3. Liga players
Sportspeople from Wiesbaden
Footballers from Hesse